Kasian (also Romanized as Kasīān) is a village in Bastam Rural District, in the Central District of Chaypareh County, West Azerbaijan Province, Iran. At the 2006 census, its population was 279, in 69 families.

References 

Populated places in Chaypareh County